Eduardo García Vergara (8 March 1945 – 26 February 2016) was a footballer who played international football for both Uruguay and Ecuador.

He played club football in those two countries for Peñarol, Emelec, Nacional and Bella Vista.

He later became a coach at Emelec, and also ran a food business. He died on 26 February 2016.

References

1945 births
2016 deaths
People from Colonia del Sacramento
Uruguayan footballers
Uruguay international footballers
Ecuadorian footballers
Ecuador international footballers
Dual internationalists (football)
Uruguayan Primera División players
Ecuadorian Serie A players
Peñarol players
C.S. Emelec footballers
Club Nacional de Football players
C.A. Bella Vista players
Association football goalkeepers
Uruguayan emigrants to Ecuador